PA2 may refer to:
 ALCO PA-2, a diesel locomotive
 French aircraft carrier PA2 (aircraft carrier 2), a cancelled ship of the French Navy
 Pad Abort Test 2, an Apollo program mission
 Paranormal Activity 2, a 2010 American supernatural horror film
 Pennsylvania's 2nd congressional district
 Pennsylvania Route 2, a former state route in Pennsylvania
 Pitcairn PA-2 Sesquiwing, a biplane
 The PA2, a type of rolling stock used on the PATH train in New York and New Jersey
 PA2 key, on the IBM 3270 keyboard